Health Systems Engineering or Health Engineering (often known as "Health Care Systems Engineering (HCSE)") is an academic and a pragmatic discipline that approaches the health care industry, and other industries connected with health care delivery, as complex adaptive systems, and identifies and applies engineering design and analysis principles in such areas. This can overlap with biomedical engineering which focuses on design and development of various medical products; industrial engineering and operations management which involve improving organizational operations; and various health care practice fields like medicine, pharmacy, dentistry, nursing, etc.  Other fields participating in this interdisciplinary area include public health, information technology, management studies, and regulatory law.

People whose work implicates this field in some capacity can include members of all the above-noted fields, many of which have sub-fields targeted toward health care matters even if health or health care is not a principal focus of the overall field (e.g. management, law). Areas of biomedical engineering (BME) in this area often include clinical engineering (sometimes also called "hospital engineering") as well as those BMEs developing medical devices and pharmaceutical drugs.  The industrial engineering (IE) principles employed tend to include optimization, decision analysis, human factors engineering, quality engineering, and value engineering.

See also
Biological engineering
Biomedical engineering
Clinical engineering
Industrial engineering
Systems engineering
Regulatory science
Operations management
Complex adaptive systems

References

Engineering disciplines
Health care occupations
Industrial engineering